Selimar Pagán Rivera (born 6 November 1993) is a Puerto Rican footballer who plays for Puerto Rico Sol FC and the Puerto Rico women's national team.

Club career
A Bayamón FC product, Pagán played for Colombian Women's Football League club Cúcuta Deportivo in 2017 and for Women's Premier Soccer League team Puerto Rico Pride in 2018. She joined Puerto Rico Sol in mid-2018.

International goals
Scores and results list Puerto Rico's goal tally first

References 

1993 births
Living people
Puerto Rican women's footballers
Sportspeople from San Juan, Puerto Rico
Women's association football forwards
Puerto Rico women's international footballers
Women's Premier Soccer League players
Puerto Rican expatriate women's footballers
Puerto Rican expatriate sportspeople in Colombia
Expatriate women's footballers in Colombia